Qemal Haxhihasani (1916–1991) was an Albanian historian and folklorist. He is regarded as a leading expert on epic and heroic verse.

Sources 

1916 births
Albanian folklorists
1991 deaths
20th-century Albanian historians
Albanian male writers
20th-century male writers